Acrantophis dumerili, commonly known as Dumeril's boa, is a species of non-venomous snake in the family Boidae. The species is endemic to  Madagascar. No subspecies are currently recognized.

Etymology
The specific name, dumerili, is in honor of French herpetologist André Marie Constant Duméril.

Description
Adults of A. dumerili usually grow to 6.5 feet (2 m) in total length (including tail) with the maximum reported to be 8 foot, 6 inches (259 cm). Males usually have longer skinnier tails, while females tend to be larger overall.

The color pattern consists of a gray-brown ground color with darker patches, forming an effective camouflage against the leaf litter of the forest floor of their native habitat.

Distribution and habitat
A. dumerili is found on Madagascar. The type locality given in the original description is "Amérique mérid. ?", which is later given as "?" by Jan (1863).

Along the western coast and southwestern regions of Madagascar, it is found in a semi-arid habitat that gets fairly low amounts of precipitation.

Conservation status
The species A. dumerili is classified as Least Concern (LC) on the IUCN Red List for the following criteria: A1cd (v2.3, 1994). This means that a population reduction of at least 20% has been observed, estimated, inferred or suspected over the last 10 years or three generations, whichever is the longer, based on a decline in area of occupancy, extent of occurrence and/or quality of habitat, and based on actual or potential levels of exploitation. The species was last assessed in 2011.

A. dumerili is also listed as CITES Appendix I, which means that it is threatened with extinction and CITES prohibits international trade except when the purpose of the import is not commercial, for example for scientific research.

It is threatened by deforestation and human persecution. In some areas it is feared and often killed on sight. Although some native lore would relate stories of the souls of the tribes ancestors being in the snake skins, because patterns of faces on the sides of the snakes are interpreted, making them religiously sacred and therefore not dangerous to some cultures.

Feeding
The diet of A. dumerili consists of small animals, such as birds, lizards, and small mammals, including juvenile lemurs. It is also known to prey on other snakes.

Reproduction
In A. dumerili sexual maturity is reached within 3 to 5 years of age. Males have anal spurs, which are used in courtship.
The mating season is March through May, and the young are born some 6 to 8 months later. Ovoviviparous, females give birth to a litters of 6-28. Neonates are 12-18 inches (30–46 cm) long.

Captivity
Once exported from Madagascar in great numbers, trade in A. dumerili has since been heavily restricted. The species is, however, quite prolific in captivity, and captive bred individuals are easy to find in the exotic pet trade. Though its size makes it more suited to someone experienced with large constrictors, it has a typically docile nature, and readily feeds on rats. The main concern is that it is prone to stress, which can sometimes cause it to stop eating or can contribute to other health issues.

References

Further reading

Boulenger GA (1893). Catalogue of the Snakes in the British Museum (Natural History). Volume I., Containing the Families ... Boidæ ... London: Trustees of the British Museum (Natural History). (Taylor and Francis, printers). xiii + 448 pp. + Plates I-XXVIII. (Boa dumerilii, p. 120).
Jan G, [ Sordelli F ] "1861" [1860]. Iconographie générale des Ophidiens, Première livraison. Paris: Baillière. Index + Plates I-VI. (Acrantophis dumerili, new species, Plate II). (in French).
Kluge AG (1991). "Boine Snake Phylogeny and Research Cycles". Miscellaneous Publications, Museum of Zoology, University of Michigan (178): 1-58. PDF at University of Michigan Library. Accessed 11 July 2008.
Vences M, Glaw F, Kosuch J, Böhme W, Veith M (2001). "Phylogeny of South American and Malagasy Boine Snakes: Molecular Evidence for the Validity of Sanzinia and Acrantophis and Biogeographic Implications". Copeia 2001 (4): 1151–1154. PDF at Miguel Vences. Accessed 29 August 2008.
Vences M, Glaw F (2003). "Phylogeography, systematics and conservation status of boid snakes from Madagascar (Sanzinia and Acrantophis)". Salamandra, Reinbach 39 (3/4): 181–206. PDF at Miguel Vences. Accessed 29 August 2008.

External links

 

Boinae
Reptiles of Madagascar
Reptiles described in 1860
Taxa named by Giorgio Jan